Greece competed at the 2022 World Athletics Championships in Eugene, Oregon, United States, from 15 July to 24 July 2022. A team of 19 athletes, 12 women and 7 men, represented the country in a total of 13 events.

Medalists

Results

Men
Track and road events

Field events

Women 
Track and road events

Field events

Sources 
Official website
Official IAAF competition website
ΟΡΕΓΚΟΝ 2022: Με 18μελη αποστολή στο παγκόσμιο η Εθνική 

World Championships in Athletics
Greece at the World Championships in Athletics
Nations at the 2022 World Athletics Championships